Infectious diseases or ID, also known as infectiology, is a medical specialty dealing with the diagnosis and treatment of infections. An infectious diseases specialist's practice consists of managing nosocomial (healthcare-acquired) infections or community-acquired infections and is historically associated with hygiene, epidemiology, clinical microbiology, travel medicine and tropical medicine.

Scope
Infectious diseases specialists typically serve as consultants to other physicians in cases of complex infections, and often manage patients with HIV/AIDS and other forms of immunodeficiency. Although many common infections are treated by physicians without formal expertise in infectious diseases, specialists may be consulted for cases where an infection is difficult to diagnose or manage. They may also be asked to help determine the cause of a fever of unknown origin.

Specialists in infectious diseases can practice both in hospitals (inpatient) and clinics (outpatient). In hospitals, specialists in infectious diseases help ensure the timely diagnosis and treatment of acute infections by recommending the appropriate diagnostic tests to identify the source of the infection and by recommending appropriate management such as prescribing antibiotics to treat bacterial infections. For certain types of infections, involvement of specialists in infectious diseases may improve patient outcomes. In clinics, specialists in infectious diseases can provide long-term care to patients with chronic infections such as HIV/AIDS.

History 

Infectious diseases are historically associated with hygiene and epidemiology due to periodic outbreaks ravaging countries, especially in the cities before the advent of sanitation, but also with travel medicine and tropical medicine, as many diseases acquired in tropical and subtropical areas are infectious in nature.

Investigations
Infectious diseases specialists employ a variety of diagnostic tests to help identify the pathogen that is causing an infection. Common tests include Gram staining, blood cultures, serological tests, genotyping, and polymerase chain reaction.

Treatments
Infectious diseases specialists employ a variety of antimicrobial agents to help treat infections. The type of antimicrobial depends on the organism that is causing the infection. Antibiotics are used to treat bacterial infections; antiviral agents treat viral infections; and antifungal agents treat fungal infections.

Training

United States
In the United States, infectious diseases is a subspecialty of internal medicine and pediatrics. In order to "sit" for the infectious diseases' board certification test (administered by the American Board of Internal Medicine, or the American Board of Pediatrics), physicians must have completed their residency (in internal medicine, or pediatrics), then undergo additional fellowship training (for at least 2, or 3 years, respectively). The exam has been given as a subspecialty of internal medicine since 1972 and as a subspecialty of pediatrics since 1994.

References

External links 
 IDSA - Infectious Diseases Society of America

Infectious diseases